Montana Democratic Party (MDP) is the affiliate of the Democratic Party in the U.S. state of Montana and one of the two major political parties in the state. The party as of 2021 is chaired by Robyn Driscoll. The National Committeeman is Jorge Quintana, and the National Committeewoman is Jean Lemire Dahlman.

History
The party typically meets in Butte.

Recent years
In 2017 during a special election for a Congressional seat, state party officials "grew frustrated" according to the New York Times when national Democratic Party officials Chuck Schumer and Nancy Pelosi were implored by Democratic Senator Jon Tester to with-hold from spending national party money on his rival Rob Quist, the Democratic nominee in Montana, without success. Quist ultimately lost the seat to Republican Greg Gianforte.

In January 2020, Sandi Luckey, previously the state party treasurer for the Democratic party, was elected executive director of the Montana Democratic Party. Robyn Driscoll was party chair at that time. The state party announced in May 2020 that it was creating a Steering Committee for the Blue Bench Program, and that it would have three of those positions dedicated permanently for Native American leaders. The Blue Bench Program recruited and developed local candidates to run for office. At that time, the state party's voting delegates largely consisted of legislative leadership, Democrats in statewide elected office, and leaders in Democratic Central Committees for state countries. The party had no delegate votes assigned specifically for Native Americans, and three voting delegates at state conventions who were Native Americans. The Associated Press reported in June 2020 that the state party voted to establish tribal committees to represent the Crow, Northern Cheyenne, Fort Peck, Fort Belknap, Rocky Boy's, Blackfeet and Flathead reservations and the Little Shell-Chippewa tribe,  and the committees would operate "like county central committees, whose delegates vote on the party's platform, rules and officers and nominate candidates for special elections." Luckey, still the state party executive director, said the move made the Montana Democratic Party the first US state country to formally create a formal role based on population for Native Americans.

In February 2022, Democratic senator Jon Tester criticized the larger state party for not doing more to appeal to and engage with "Middle America," clarifying he meant the area between the Appalachians the Rocky Mountains.

In June 2022 NPR reported that Montana had two U.S. House districts for the first time since 1992, and while the Montana Democratic Party had three candidates in that month's primary, it hadn't had representation in the U.S. House since 1994. In August 2022, Montana Democrats meeting in Butte announced a new platform, largely statements of principal, such as supporting abortion rights and declaring a "state of climate emergency." New policy objectives included restoring the Judicial Nominating Commission, recently eliminated by Republicans, and establishing a panel to examine atrocities at the state's former boarding schools for Native Americans. The state party's executive director remained Sheila Hogan, at the only Democrat in statewide or federal office at the time was Senator Jon Tester.

Elected officers

Current elected officials
The Montana Democratic Party currently hold none of the six statewide offices and a minority of the seats in both the Montana Senate and Montana House of Representatives. They hold one of the state's U.S. Senate seats.

Member of Congress

U.S. Senate

Statewide offices
 None

Legislative leaders

16 Members of the Montana Senate

32 Members of the Montana House of Representatives

Election results

Presidential

Gubernatorial

See also
 Political party strength in Montana
 Montana Libertarian Party
 Montana Republican Party

References

External links
 Montana Democratic Party

 
Democratic Party (United States) by state
Democratic Party